This list of early third generation computers, tabulates those computers using monolithic integrated circuits (ICs) as their primary logic elements, starting from small-scale integration CPUs (SSI) to large-scale integration CPUs (LSI). Computers primarily using ICs first came into use about 1961 for military use.  With the availability of reliable low cost ICs in the mid 1960s commercial third generation computers using ICs started to appear.

The fourth generation computers began with the shipment of CPS-1, the first commercial microprocessor microcomputer in 1972 and for the purposes of this list marks the end of the "early" third generation computer era.  Note that third generation computers were offered well into the 1990s.

The list is organized by delivery year to customers or production/operational date. In some cases only the first computer from any one manufacturer is listed. Computers announced, but never completed, are not included. Computers without documented manual input (keyboard/typewriter/control unit) are also not included.

Aerospace and military computers (1961-1971) 
1961
 Semiconductor Network Computer (Molecular Electronic Computer, Mol-E-Com), first monolithic integrated circuit general purpose computer (built for demonstration purposes, programmed to simulate a desk calculator) was built by Texas Instruments for the US Air Force.

1962
 Martin MARTAC 420 (Fairchild Micrologic)
 AC Spark Plug MAGIC (Fairchild Micrologic)
 Librascope L-90 series (silicon planar epitaxial semiconductor IC)

1963
 UNIVAC 1824
 Autonetics D37 (Solid Circuit, Texas Instruments)

1965
 Apollo Guidance Computer First installation
 Burroughs D84
Litton L-304 - TTL IC
Honeywell ALERT - HLTTL IC
Autonetics D26 - DTL IC

1967
Ballistic Research Laboratories Electronic Scientific Computer Model II (BRLESC II) 
CDC 449
CP-823/U

1970
AN/UYK-7
Rolm 1601 (AN/UYK-12(V)), Feb 1970

1971
AN/GYK-12 Militarized version of Litton L-3050

Commercial computers (1965-1971) 

This table of commercial 3rd generation computers has been constructed by merging of several lists of computers offered from February 1965, the date of the shipment of the first commercial 3rd generation computer, thru 1971 inclusive and then finding reliable sources as to the generation of the models listed and the associated dates.

See also
List of early microcomputers

Notes

References

Works cited 
 Alt URL

Further reading 

History of computing hardware
20th century in computing